Expected value is a term used in probability theory and statistics. It may also refer to:

Physics 
 Expectation value (quantum mechanics), the probabilistic expected value of the result (measurement) of an experiment

Decision theory and quantitative policy analysis 
 Expected value of perfect information, the price that one would be willing to pay in order to gain access to perfect information
 Expected value of sample information, the expected increase in utility that a decision-maker could obtain from gaining access to a sample of additional observations before making a decision
 Expected value of including uncertainty, the expected difference in the value of a decision based on a probabilistic analysis versus a decision based on an analysis that ignores uncertainty

Business 
 Expected commercial value, also known as estimated commercial value, the prospect-weighted value for a project with unclear conclusions

See also
Expected (disambiguation)